Benjamin Allen Nicolas Hollingsworth (born September 7, 1984) is a Canadian actor. He is perhaps best known for his role on the CBS television series Code Black (2015–2018).

Early life and career
Hollingsworth was born in Brockville, Ontario. He enrolled at the National Theatre School of Canada, where he graduated in 2006.

Hollingsworth has appeared in various television shows, most notably Suits as Mike Ross's rival, Kyle Durant.

Personal life
Hollingsworth married lingerie designer and Bar Method teacher, Nila Myers, on November 10, 2012, after two years of dating. The couple have two sons, born on July 3, 2016 and March 16, 2018 and a daughter born on October 15, 2020.

Hollingsworth was in a relationship with fellow Canadian actress Nina Dobrev from 2006 to 2009. They were previously roommates before they dated.

Filmography

References

External links

1984 births
Living people
21st-century Canadian male actors
Canadian male film actors
Canadian male television actors
Male actors from Ontario
National Theatre School of Canada alumni
People from Brockville